Code golf is a type of recreational computer programming competition in which participants strive to achieve the shortest possible source code that solves a certain problem. Code golf challenges and tournaments may also be named with the programming language used (for example, Perl golf).

Etymology 
The term "code golf" is derived from the similarity of its goal with that of conventional golf, where participants seek to achieve the lowest possible score, rather than the highest, as is the standard in most sports and game scoring systems. While conventional golf players are trying to minimize the number of club strokes needed to complete the course, code golfers are striving to reduce the number of key strokes necessary to write the program.

History 
The length of the shortest possible program that produces a given output (in any fixed programming language) is known as the Kolmogorov complexity of the output, and its mathematical study dates to the work of Andrey Kolmogorov in 1963. Code golf, however, can be more general than this, as it often specifies a general input-output transformation that must be performed rather than asking for a single output with no input.
 
Whilst the term "code golf" was apparently first used in 1999 with Perl, and later popularised through the use of Perl to write a program that performed RSA encryption, a similar informal competition is known to have been popular with earlier APL hackers. The challenging nature of aggressively optimizing for program size has itself long been recognized; for example, a 1962 coding manual for Regnecentralen's GIER computer notes that "it is a time-consuming sport to code with the least possible number of instructions" and recommends against it for practical programming. Today the term has grown to cover a wide variety of languages, which has even triggered the creation of dedicated golfing languages.

Dedicated golfing languages 
Several new languages have been created specifically with code golfing in mind. Examples include GolfScript, Flogscript and Vyxal, which are Turing-complete languages which provide constructs for concisely expressing ideas in code. Because golfing languages compete for extreme brevity, their design sacrifices readability, which is important for practical production environments, and therefore they are often esoteric. Sometimes, however, a language is designed for a practical purpose, but turns out to be suitable for code golf.

An example of GolfScript code to print 1000 digits of pi:
;''
6666,-2%{2+.2/@*\/10.3??2*+}*
`1000<~\;
This prints a string starting with "3141592653" followed by 990 more digits of pi.

Code golf websites include novel golfing languages created by users to win code golf challenges. Other popular languages include 05AB1E, Husk, Pyth, CJam and Jelly.

Types of code golf 
Some code golf questions, such as those posed on general programming sites, may not require implementation in a specific programming language. However, this limits the style of problems that it is possible for the problem designers to pose (for example, by limiting the use of certain language features). In addition, the creation of such "open" questions has resulted in the design of code golf specific programming language dialects such as REBMU (a dialect of REBOL). Both online and live competitions may also include time limits.

See also 

Code poetry
Data compression
Minification (programming)
Perl pastimes
Kolmogorov complexity
Kata (programming)

References

External links 
CodeGolf.StackExchange.com: Questions and answers on programming puzzles and code golf
List of dedicated golfing languages
regular expression golfing: a fun variant to code golf
ShortestWikiContest
Reverse Code Golf (xkcd)

Programming contests